The Bangorian Controversy was a theological argument within the Church of England in the early 18th century, with strong political overtones. The origins of the controversy lay in the 1716 posthumous publication of George Hickes's Constitution of the Catholic Church, and the Nature and Consequences of Schism. In it, Hickes, as Bishop of Thetford, on behalf of the minority non-juror faction that had broken away from the Church of England after the Glorious Revolution, excommunicated all but the non-juror churchmen.  Benjamin Hoadly, the Bishop of Bangor, wrote a reply, Preservative against the Principles and Practices of Non-Jurors; his own Erastian position was sincerely proposed as the only test of truth.

The controversy itself began very visibly and vocally when Hoadly delivered a sermon on 31 March 1717 to George I of Great Britain on The Nature of the Kingdom of Christ. His text was John 18:36, "My kingdom is not of this world" and from that, Hoadly deduced, supposedly at the request of the king himself, that there is no Biblical justification for any church government of any sort. He identified the church with the Kingdom of Heaven. It was therefore not of this world, and Christ had not delegated His authority to any representatives.

Background

Two competing visions of government were in play.  On the one hand, there was a vision of God appointing the king and the bishops to be leaders, selecting them from all others and imbuing them with special characters, either through grace or in creation.  That view held that the king, as the head of the Established Church, was not only a secular leader of a state but also a religious primate. Power and regulation flowed downward from God to the people. That was the aristocratic model that was favoured by the Tory party and had been used to propose the divine right of kings.

The other view was that power flowed up from the people to the leaders, that leaders were no more intrinsically better than those led, and God gives out revelation freely. That Whig view was also the view of the Puritans and the "Independents" (the various Congregational and Baptist churches, Quakers etc.).

George I favoured the Whigs in Parliament and favoured a latitudinarian ecclesiastical policy in general. That was probably not by any desire to give up royal prerogative but to break the power of the aristocracy and the House of Lords. A significant obstacle to all kings of England had been the presence of bishops in the Lords.  While a king could create peers, it was much more difficult for him to move bishops into and out of the Lords.

Sermon and aftermath
The sermon was immediately published and instantly drew counterattacks. William Law (Three Letters to the Bishop of Bangor) and Thomas Sherlock (dean of Chichester), in particular, gave vigorous defences of church polity. Hoadly himself wrote A Reply to the Representations of Convocation to answer Sherlock, Andrew Snape, provost of Eton, and Francis Hare, then dean of Worcester. The three men, and another opponent, Robert Moss, dean of Ely, were deprived of their royal chaplaincies by the king. Hoadly did not, however, attempt to answer William Law. It has been claimed that in all, over 200 pamphlets linked to the controversy were published by 53 writers. Of those, 74 were published in July 1717.

In May 1717, the Convocation appointed a committee to study the sermon. When the report was ready for synodal sanction against Hoadly, the king dismissed the convocation, which did not meet again for over 130 years.

Timeline of publications

See also
 1716 in literature
 1717 in literature
 1718 in literature

References

Further reading
Cross, F. A., ed. The Oxford Dictionary of the Christian Church. 1964.  London: Oxford University Press.

Church of England and the Bangorian controversy, 1716–1721. Andrew Starkie: 2007: Boydell Press.

18th-century controversies
History of the Church of England
18th century in England
Protestantism-related controversies
1717 in Christianity
18th-century Protestantism